Diocese or Archdiocese of Indianapolis may refer to the following ecclesiastical jurisdictions 
with the episcopal or archepiscopal see in the city of Indianapolis, Indiana, USA:

 the Roman Catholic Archdiocese of Indianapolis (formerly Suffragan Diocese of Indianapolis, 1898–1944)
 the Episcopal Diocese of Indianapolis